Sarvam Thaala Mayam is the soundtrack album for the 2019 Tamil film of the same name. The soundtrack consists of six feature songs along with instrumental tracks. The film's director Menon composed a song that Rahman curated.

Development 
Rahman began composing for the film in early 2016 and by May it was revealed that his two songs had been completed. As the film was a musical, Menon required the songs to be completed before production began and by November 2016, Rahman had finished composing nine songs for that film and composed parts of the background score. The lyrics were written by Madhan Karky, Arunraja Kamaraj and the late Na. Muthukumar, who worked in the film before his death in August 2016.

Track listing 
The official track list of songs was released long before the audio release by A. R. Rahman, in his Twitter page, on 19 November 2018.

Background Score 
A.R. Rahman used many different instruments for this soundtrack. In "A Journey of Peter", Peter employed instruments from North Rajasthan and the Northeast. These musical instruments are part of the background score. Rahman and his ensemble Qutub-E-Kripa adopted Indian Regional music and Carnatic music. Rahman also used a western African musical instrument called Kora. It is a 21 string lute-bridge-harp extensively used in Africa.

Album credits

Sound Engineers 
A R Rahman, Rasigan, A R Venkatesan
Mixed by - P. A. Deepak, T R Krishna Chetan, Karthik Sekaran, Jerry Vincent
Additional Programming - Santhosh Dhayanidhi
Mastered by - Suresh Perumal
MFiT mastered by - Suresh Perumal

Musicians 
Guitar - Sunil Milner, Keba Jeremiah
Flute - Kamalakar
Kanjira Player - B Shree Sundarkumar
Sunshine Orchestra Conducted by VJ Srinivasamurthy
Musicians Coordinators - Noell James, TM Faizuddin, Abdul Haiyum
Musicians Fixer - R Samidurai

References

2019 soundtrack albums
Tamil film soundtracks
A. R. Rahman soundtracks